Iravati is a character in Hindu mythology. She is a daughter of Kadru or Bhadramada and Kashyapa, as featured in the Ramayana. She is also associated with a sacred Iravati river, which was one of the names of the river Ravi of modern-day Punjab during the Vedic period. It is possible that the river Irrawaddy of Myanmar traces its name to this name for the Ravi river.

Legend 
One legend states that Indra's divine elephant, Airavata, is the offspring of Iravati.

See also
 Ganga
 Sarasvati
 Kalindi

References

External links 
Vettam Mani; Puranic Encyclopaedia. Quotes the Ramayana (Aranyakanda) for her parentage, and the Mahabharata, Anusasana Parva, for the river).

Characters in the Mahabharata
Mythological rivers
Hindu mythology